The Gilded Lily is a surviving 1921 American silent drama film directed by Robert Z. Leonard and written by Clara Beranger and Tom McNamara. The film stars Mae Murray, Lowell Sherman, Jason Robards, Sr., Charles K. Gerrard, and Leonora von Ottinger. The film was released on March 6, 1921, by Paramount Pictures.

Plot
A young man from the country goes to a big city where he falls in love with a showgirl. She then decides to give up her profession to become a housewife, and he decides to leave her.

Cast 
Mae Murray as Lillian Drake
Lowell Sherman as Creighton Howard
Jason Robards, Sr. as Frank Thompson
Charles K. Gerrard as John Stewart
Leonora von Ottinger as Mrs. Thompson

Production
The opening scene with Mae Murray wearing a gold tinsel cloth costume in front of a deep blue background was shot using the Prizma color system.

Preservation status
A print survives in Museo del Cine Buenos Aires, Pablo C. Ducros Hicken archive.

References

External links 

 
 

1921 films
1920s English-language films
Silent American drama films
1921 drama films
Paramount Pictures films
Films directed by Robert Z. Leonard
American black-and-white films
American silent feature films
1920s American films